Korubo is a nearly extinct Panoan language spoken by the Korubo people of Brazil. There are two dialects, Korubo itself and moribund Chankueshbo (Fleck 2013).

Phonology 
Korubo has 6 vowels: /a, e, i, ɨ, o, u/.

References

Indigenous languages of Western Amazonia
Panoan languages